The Forest (A Selva) is a 2002 film directed by Leonel Vieira.

The movie won the "Best Film" at the 2003 Golden Globes Portugal.

Plot
Alberto (played by Diogo Morgado) is a young Portuguese monarchist who in 1912 is exiled to Brazil. There, he is contracted by Velasco (Karra Elejalde), a Spanish overseer, to work in the heart of the forest. Alberto discovers a strange and wild world, in which the Indians, the fever and the madness of the men are daily dangers.

External links

2002 films
Films about hunter-gatherers
Films based on Portuguese novels
2000s Portuguese-language films
Films set in the 1910s
Films set in Brazil
2000s adventure films
2002 romantic drama films
Brazilian romantic drama films
Golden Globes (Portugal) winners
Spanish romantic drama films
Portuguese romantic drama films
Spanish adventure films
Portuguese adventure films
Brazilian adventure films
Films set in forests
Brazilian biographical drama films
Portuguese biographical drama films
Spanish biographical drama films
2000s Spanish films